Charles Edward Hodge (July 28, 1933 – April 16, 2016) was a Canadian ice hockey player who played as a goaltender for the Montreal Canadiens, Vancouver Canucks, and Oakland Seals of the National Hockey League between 1954 and 1971.

Early career
Charlie Hodge was born in Lachine, Quebec. Hodge was devoted to becoming a member of the Montreal Canadiens. Charlie Hodge began his hockey career with the Montreal Jr. Canadiens in 1950. In 1952, Hodge began showing his true skills finishing with a 2.22 GAA. The next year, he led the Quebec Junior Hockey League with 35 wins and 5 shutouts. Hodge then moved on to the Cincinnati Mohawks in the International Hockey League. There, he led the league in wins and shutouts and helped the Cincinnati Mohawks win the Turner Cup. In the 1954–55 season, he played his first game with the Montreal Canadiens.

NHL career
Hodge's first NHL game occurred in 1954 with Montreal. Because teams in that era only carried one goalie, and Montreal had perhaps the best goalie of the era in Jacques Plante, Hodge was only used in emergency situations. During this time, he played mostly in the American Hockey League. When Plante was traded in 1963, Hodge got his chance to play full-time. He twice won the Vezina Trophy for being the goaltender of the team allowing the fewest goals during the regular season, once outright in 1963–64 and shared with Gump Worsley in 1965–66. Hodge's name appears on the league championship Stanley Cup six times, although he only actually played in one of those finals. He also played 1 game in the finals in 1955, but lost to Detroit. In 1967, young goaltender Rogatien Vachon was called up by the Canadiens. Vachon played superbly, and there was no more room for Hodge. Hodge was left unprotected in 1967 and he was picked up by the Oakland Seals in the 1967 NHL Expansion Draft.

In Oakland, Hodge earned 13 wins, including 3 shutouts. Next season, he saw his playing time greatly reduced and was sent down to the Western Hockey League where he played for the Vancouver Canucks. Hodge was an expansion pick again when the Vancouver Canucks entered the NHL in 1970. He posted a winning record while sharing netminding duties with George Gardner and Dunc Wilson. He retired after being unable to come to contract terms with General Manager Bud Poile.

Post-playing career
Hodge sold real estate for a decade until Winnipeg Jets GM John Ferguson recruited him for the team's scout in Western Canada.

Hodge thereafter was an amateur scout for the NHL's Tampa Bay Lightning after two decades with the Pittsburgh Penguins. He received Stanley Cup rings with Pittsburgh in 1991 and 1992. He primarily scouted the Vancouver Giants and Chilliwack Bruins of the Western Hockey League and the Lower Mainland clubs in the British Columbia Hockey League.

Awards and achievements
 Turner Cup Championship in 1954.
 Stanley Cup Championship as a goaltender in 1956, 1958, 1959, 1960, 1965, 1966 with Montreal.
 Stanley Cup Champion 1992 as Scout with Pittsburgh.
 Vezina Trophy Winner in 1964 and in 1966 (shared with Gump Worsley).
 Played in 1964, 1965, and 1967 NHL All-Star Games.
 Selected to the NHL Second All-Star Team in 1964 & 1965.

Career statistics

Regular season and playoffs

External links
 
 Crusty old bird dog Hodge still beating bushes for talent, By Gary Kingston, The Vancouver Sun, May 26, 2007

1933 births
2016 deaths
Anglophone Quebec people
Canadian ice hockey coaches
Canadian ice hockey goaltenders
Canadian male canoeists
Hull-Ottawa Canadiens players
Ice hockey people from Montreal
Montreal Canadiens players
Montreal Junior Canadiens players
Montreal Royals (EPHL) players
Montreal Royals (QSHL) players
Oakland Seals players
People from Lachine, Quebec
Pittsburgh Penguins scouts
Quebec Aces (AHL) players
Seattle Americans players
Shawinigan-Falls Cataracts (QSHL) players
Stanley Cup champions
Tampa Bay Lightning scouts
Vancouver Canucks players
Vancouver Canucks (WHL) players
Vancouver Nats coaches
Vezina Trophy winners
Winnipeg Jets (1972–1996) scouts